In the Arabic language Auliya is the plural of Wali, which means friends, protectors, helpers and may refer to:
Madinat-ul-Auliya, Multan, "the city of the saints"
Nizamuddin Auliya, Sunni Muslim scholar, Sufi saint of the Chishti Order
Qalandar Baba Auliya,  Sufi mystic

The Auliyas, a people within the Uchhala peoples